The 2018 BNP Paribas Primrose Bordeaux was a professional tennis tournament played on clay courts. It was the eleventh edition of the tournament which was part of the 2018 ATP Challenger Tour. It took place in Bordeaux, France between 14 and 20 May 2018.

Singles main-draw entrants

Seeds

 1 Rankings are as of May 7, 2018.

Other entrants
The following players received wildcards into the singles main draw:
  Grégoire Barrère
  Arthur De Greef
  Ugo Humbert
  Sergiy Stakhovsky

The following player received entry into the singles main draw as an alternate:
  Antoine Hoang

The following players received entry from the qualifying draw:
  Elliot Benchetrit
  Maxime Janvier
  Alexandre Müller
  Alexei Popyrin

The following player received entry as a lucky loser:
  Mathias Bourgue

Champions

Singles

 Reilly Opelka def.  Grégoire Barrère 6–7(5–7), 6–4, 7–5.

Doubles

  Bradley Klahn /  Peter Polansky def.  Guillermo Durán /  Máximo González 6–3, 3–6, [10–7].

External links
Official Website

2018 ATP Challenger Tour
2018
2018 in French tennis